A proportioning valve is a valve that relies on the laws of fluid pressure to distribute input forces to one or more output lines.  A proportioning valve can increase or decrease forces for each output, depending on the cross-sectional surface areas of those output lines.

A simple example is an input tube with cross-sectional area A entering a chamber.  Leading out of the chamber are two more tubes, one with cross-sectional area 3A and the other with area A/2.  If a force F is applied to the fluid in the input tube, the pressure in that tube will be F/A.  Utilizing pressure laws, we find that each output tube will see the same pressure.  This means the output tube with area 3A will yield a force of 3F, and the output tube with area A/2 will yield a force of F/2.  Thus, if you apply a 10-pound force to the input, you will get forces of 30 lbf and 5 lbf, respectively, from the outputs. If you apply a 10-newton force to the input, you will get forces of 30 N and 5 N, respectively, from the outputs

Proportioning valves are frequently used in cars to reduce the brake fluid pressure to the rear brakes. In cars with disc brakes on the front and drum brakes on the back, more pressure is needed for the disc brakes in the front. The proportioning valve prevents the rear brakes from engaging before the front brakes during panic stops.

See also
 Pressure regulator
 Electronic brakeforce distribution

References
Fundamentals of Automotive Technology: Principles and Practice. Jones & Bartlett Publishers, Aug 1, 2013 pg. 1013

Valves
Vehicle braking technologies